The Three Robbers (Die drei Räuber) is a full-length 2007 animated film adaption of the 1961 children's book by Tomi Ungerer, which was previously adapted as a 6-minute animated adaptation released in 1972 by Gene Deitch. The film was released in America under the title of the Trick or Treaters, with the original material shortened and reworked into a Halloween story.

Plot
Three brothers are very successful in their exploits as highwayman robbers: Dominik using his blunderbuss to intimidate coachmen and passengers, Felix using his pepper-blower to disorientate and blind the horses, while the eldest brother Maximus vandalizes and damages the carriage wheels with his red battle axe. But, one day the robbers intercept a carriage, only to find a lonely girl named Tiffany whose parents died and is being sent to live with a wicked aunt who runs an orphanage. Not wanting to go to the orphanage, Tiffany tricks the robbers into believing she was the daughter of a maharaja, and is carried off to their hideout. While Tiffany makes the robbers question what they intend to do with their amassed wealth, she helps them learn to read and write when they want to send a ransom letter. The robbers eventually learn Tiffany lied to them when they found her missing child poster. Tiffany is remorseful and leaves in shame to head to the orphanage.

Tiffany encounters two runaway orphans along the way to the orphanage. From them she learns that Auntie places the children in mandatory child labor to harvest sugar beets and extract the sugar for her pastry-making machine to make her desserts. After secretly entering the orphanage while the runways are captured, Tiffany exposes Auntie's pastry hoard to the other orphans. Auntie was about to punish Tiffany when the robbers arrive, revealed to be runaway orphans themselves as they make amends with Tiffany. Auntie refuses to hand Tiffany over to the robbers before falling into her pastry-making vat in a fit of insanity and is turned into a cake which the orphans eat. The robbers then use their wealth to buy the orphanage, which becomes a haven for all uncared children; eventually growing into a large town with its residents revering the robbers.

Characters
The Orphan Tiffany
Robber #1 Dominik (has a blunderbuss to threaten the passengers).
Robber #2 Felix (has a pepper-blower to blind the horses).
Robber #3 Maximus (has a huge red axe to chop the carriage wheels).
The Evil Aunty 
The Poilceman
The Coachman Frog
Nikolas
Gregory
The Children of the Orphanage
The Slow Unicorn
Mr.Narrator

Voice cast

Accolades
The film received the second prize for Animated Feature Film or Video in the Adult Jury Prizes at the Chicago International Children's Film Festival in 2007, and in 2008 and 2009 was awarded first prizes and audience awards at film festivals in Hamburg (Germany), Paris, Bordeaux, Annecy (France), Poznan (Poland), Bilbao (Spain), Brussels, Ghent (Belgium), Bucharest (Romania), and Toronto. It received the audience Award at the Annecy International Animated Film Festival, 2008. Trick or Treaters DVD was released on September 6, 2016 in United States.

References

External links
 Trailer
 Movie homepage (in German)
 German-Films Film Archive
 

1961 German novels
German animated short films
1972 films
German children's novels
German novels adapted into films
German children's films
1961 children's books
French books
Fictional thieves
Male characters in literature
Male literary villains
1970s German films
2000s German films